The 1933–34 League of Ireland was the thirteenth season of the League of Ireland. Dundalk were the defending champions.

Bohemians won their fourth title.

Overview
No new teams were elected to the League.

Teams

Table

Results

Top goalscorers

Source:

See also 

 1933–34 FAI Cup

References

Ireland
Lea
League of Ireland seasons